Tokudaia is a genus of murine rodent native to Japan. Known as Ryūkyū spiny rats or spinous country-rats, population groups exist on several non-contiguous islands. Despite differences in name and appearance, they are the closest living relatives of the Eurasian field mouse (Apodemus). Of the three species, both T. osimensis and T. tokunoshimensis have lost their Y chromosome and SRY gene; the sex chromosomes of T. muenninki, on the other hand, are abnormally large.

Named species are:
 Muennink's spiny rat, Tokudaia muenninki
 Ryukyu spiny rat, Tokudaia osimensis
 Tokunoshima spiny rat, Tokudaia tokunoshimensis

At least Tokudaia osimensis may be a cryptic species complex.

See also
 Ellobius

References 

 
Rodent genera
Endemic mammals of Japan
Endemic fauna of the Ryukyu Islands